The Libertas Institute is a lobby group that along with others successfully campaigned for a "no" vote in the 2008 referendum in Ireland on the Treaty of Lisbon.

Mission statement
Its mission statement was "...to initiate and provoke enlightened discussion on the European Union, its relevance to its member states and peoples and its role in World affairs having regard to our shared values of peace, democracy, individual liberty and free markets..."

Founders
The founders of the Libertas Institute were:

Personnel
Libertas Institute personnel included:

Charter
The Libertas Charter (archived here) defined what was considered to be Europe's traditional values and influences, asserted what citizens' rights and responsibilities were, acknowledged the EU's role since WWII, stated that the present EU's structure was inherently undemocratic and unaccountable, and pledged to create a popular movement to debate Europe's future.

The charter was signed by the following:

 Declan J. Ganley
 Naoise Nunn
 Dr. Constantin Gurdgiev
 Paul MacDonnell
 Carlos Rodriguez
 Dr. Jana Hybaskowa, MEP
 Ivan Gabal
 Dr. Chris Coughlan
 Professor Roger Downer
 Artur Osuchowski
 Stephen Nolan
 Dr. Eamonn Conway
 Eamonn Cregan
 Gerard Lawless
 Diego Solana
 Francis O'Flaherty
 James O'Reilly
 David Cochrane
 Keith O'Grady
 Fiona Fallon
 Zoltan Angyal
 Professor Antonio Bar Cendón
 Michael McCann

Press releases
The first Libertas Institute press release archived on the Wayback Machine dates to 22 June 2007. It concerned French President Nicolas Sarkozy and the Treaty of Lisbon's clause regarding free and undistorted competition: an article by Ganley dated 16 July 2007 in Business Week covered similar themes. The Libertas Institute continued to release press releases during its existence.

Commonality with other organisations

Libertas is registered at Moyne Park, Tuam, County Galway along with other organisations associated with Libertas and/or Declan Ganley. A list of organisations associated with Libertas.eu and/or Declan Ganley is given here.

Funding

Expenditure
2007 expenditure by Libertas Institute Ltd according to its accounts was:

The deadline for submitting a copy of its 2008 bank statement to SIPO was 31 March 2009.

Expenditure during the Lisbon I campaign was estimated at "approximately €800,000", "exceeded €1 million", or "€1.3 million", or "€1.8 million".

Income
The Libertas Institute had a loan facility with Ganley, and by 3 October 2008 it had used €200,000 of this money. Since 1 January 2008, it also had the facility to receive public donations via its website. Ganley and his wife (Delia Mary Ganley, née Paterek) also donated the maximum amount of €6,300 each. Libertas stated that its donors were "100% Irish".

Regulation
The Libertas Institute was a "third party" for the purposes of political fundraising. Regulation of such is monitored by the Standards in Public Office Commission which imposed a donations limit of €5,348 per donor per year, rising to €6,348.69 per donor per year in 2009, imposes a limit of €126.97 for any given anonymous donation, and disallows any donation from any non-Irish citizens resident outside the island of Ireland.

Aims
The Libertas Institute advocated a European Energy Innovation Fund intended to license and fund carbon-neutral energy producers, the funding deriving from auctions of  emissions allowances. It also deprecated the Treaty of Lisbon and advocated a "no" vote in Lisbon I, the first Irish referendum on the Treaty of Lisbon.

Libertas in the Lisbon I campaign

On 12 March 2008, Libertas launched a "no" campaign called "Facts, not politics"
and stated that they expected to spend in the region of €1.5m on the campaign.
The campaign targeted wavering moderates, the most critical votes for the referendum. The campaign was joined by businessman Ulick McEvaddy on 20 April 2008. Activities undertaken by Libertas during the referendum were as follows:

Several politicians, including Minister of State for European Affairs Dick Roche, clashed with the group's campaign stance
but the Sunday Business Post reported that the group's efforts at projecting its warnings about the treaty in the media were "hugely successful".

The referendum was held on 12 June 2008
and defeated by 53.4% to 46.6%, with a turnout of 53.1%.

Aftermath
Following the referendum, attention shifted to Ganley's new political party Libertas.eu, and the Libertas Institute website libertas.org was redirected to that party's website.

Notes

References

External links
 Who is Declan Ganley? website
 Libertas Institute homepage prior to its redirect to Libertas.eu. Accessed via Wayback Machine.
 Libertas Institute blog. Accessed via Wayback Machine
 Constitution Watch blog. Accessed via Wayback Machine
 David Cochrane editor politics.ie

Libertas.eu
Political organisations based in the Republic of Ireland